Luc-la-Primaube is a commune in the Aveyron department in southern France, in Occitanie, 10 kilometres south of Rodez.

Commune name
Luc-la-Primaube was called Luc until September 12, 2005. The new name was made official by the decree n° 2005-1155 of the bearing September 12, 2005.

Geography
Luc is a small town where the commune's town hall is located. La Primaube is a commercial small town built on flat ground, without river or hill, which has a church with a bell-tower, and a commercial area with fountains. Luc-Primaube station has rail connections to Toulouse and Rodez.

History
The history of Luc-la-Primaube is related to the old parish of Capelle Saint-Martin, which was formerly under the domination of the abbey of Bonnecombe. The relic of Saint-Martin once brought many people to the parish to cure the disease known as "worms". Today the relic is located at the Sainte-Anne old people's home.

Population

See also
Communes of the Aveyron department

References

Communes of Aveyron
Aveyron communes articles needing translation from French Wikipedia